Archibald Stansfeld Belaney (September 18, 1888 – April 13, 1938), commonly known as Grey Owl, was a British-born conservationist, fur trapper, and writer who disguised himself as a Native American man. While he achieved fame as a conservationist during his life, after his death, the revelation that he was not Indigenous, along with other autobiographical fabrications, negatively affected his reputation.

Belaney rose to prominence as a notable author and lecturer, primarily on environmental issues. In working with the National Parks Branch, Grey Owl became the subject of many films, and was established as the "'caretaker of park animals' at Riding Mountain National Park in Manitoba" in 1931. Together with his numerous articles, books, films and lectures, his views on conservation reached audiences beyond the borders of Canada. His conservation views largely focused on humans' negative impact on nature through their commodification of nature's resources for profits, and a need for humans to develop a respect for the natural world.

Recognition of Belaney has included biographies, a historic plaque at his birthplace, and a 1999 biopic about his life by the director Richard Attenborough.

Early life 
Archibald Stansfeld Belaney was born in September 1888, in Hastings, Sussex, England. Born to George Belaney and his wife Katherine "Kittie" Cox, he was mostly of English descent on both sides; his paternal grandfather had come from Scotland and married in England.

Kittie was his father's second wife. Years before Archie's birth, George Belaney had emigrated to the United States with his then-wife Elizabeth Cox and her younger sister, Kittie. After Elizabeth's early death, George persuaded Kittie, not yet 20, to marry him, a marriage that would have been illegal back home because it was prior to the Deceased Wife's Sister's Marriage Act 1907. Within the year they returned to Britain in time for the birth of their son Archie. The family lived together near Hastings until Kittie became pregnant for a second time. George and Kittie Belaney left to return to the United States, where he abandoned her. Archie remained in England in the care of his father's mother Juliana Belaney and his father's two younger sisters, Julia Caroline Belaney and Janet Adelaide Belaney, who the boy would know as Aunt Carry and Aunt Ada. Kittie visited him a few times.

Belaney later told his publisher his father was Scottish. The Belaney name does have roots in Scotland. One of his biographers documented that Archie's paternal grandfather had moved from Scotland to England, where he became a successful merchant.

Belaney attended Hastings Grammar School, where he excelled in subjects such as English, French and chemistry. While outside school, he spent much time reading, or exploring St Helen's Wood near his home.

As a boy, Belaney was known for pranks, such as using his grammar school chemistry to make small bombs. He called them  "Belaney Bombs". Fascinated by Native Americans, Belaney read about them and drew them in the margins of his books. Belaney left Hastings Grammar School and started work as a clerk with a timber company located behind St Helen's Wood. There Belaney and his friend George McCormick perfected the arts of knife throwing and marksmanship. Belaney turned his creativity to pursuits other than work. His last event there was lowering fireworks down the chimney of the timber company's office. The fireworks exploded and nearly destroyed the building. After the timber yard fired him, Belaney's aunts let him move to Canada, where he sought adventure.

Immigration to Canada
On March 29, 1906, Belaney boarded SS Canada and sailed from Liverpool, England for Halifax, Nova Scotia. He emigrated ostensibly to study agriculture. After a brief time in Toronto, he moved to Temagami (Tema-Augama), Northern Ontario, where he worked as a fur trapper, a wilderness guide at Keewaydin camp, and a forest ranger. He then fabricated a Native American identity, though he varied the details of his new parentage, at times telling people that he was the child of a Scottish father and Apache mother, and to have emigrated from the U.S. to join the Ojibwa in Canada.

Trapping
Belaney went to Toronto to earn money in the retail industry with aims of travelling farther north. Before heading to Northern Ontario to stay with the Guppy family in Lake Timiskaming, Belaney was keen to become a guide and continued to educate himself in nature. Before becoming a trapper, Belaney sought first-hand experience to learn the basic skills of a woodsman and apprenticed himself to Bill Guppy, who taught Belaney how to use snow-shoes and the basics of trapping, including how to place several types of trap. Following the Guppy family, he moved to Lake Temagami (Tema-Augama), Northern Ontario, where he worked as a chore boy at the Temagami Inn. For two years, Belaney worked as a chore boy and also made a trip back to Britain.

Upon his return to Lake Temagami, Belaney's fascination with the Anishinaabe people increased. Belaney set about studying their language and lore while conducting a relationship with Ojibwa co-worker Angele Egwuna. Egwuna furthered Belaney's knowledge of trapping and fish nets, and also provided access to a network of Ojibwe people. Belaney claims he passionately embraced the cause of the Ojibwe, and that in turn the Ojibwe treated Belaney as one of their own. In 1909, Belaney spent a winter with the Ojibwa trappers, and said he had been adopted as an Ojibwa trapper. In Donald B. Smith's From the Land of Shadows, it is said that Belaney's greatest lesson was the fragility of the environmental ecosystem, which was influential in forming his conservationist views. On August 23, 1910, he and Angele Egwuna married.

In the armed forces
Belaney enlisted with the Canadian Overseas Expeditionary Force (CEF) on May 6, 1915 during the First World War. His Regimental number with the CEF was 415259. On his attestation papers, he claimed to be born in Montreal on September 18, 1888, and listed no next of kin. When asked about his marital status, it appears some confusion may have occurred; the word 'yes' was written and then crossed out, then the word 'no' was written and crossed out, leaving his marital status unclear to the military at the time of enlistment. He stated his trade was a 'trapper' and that he previously served as a 'Mexican Scout' with the 28th Dragoons, although this is unclear since the U.S. was not in any significant military actions in the region (other than small operations, in which he could not have served; he would have had to serve between 1904 and 1915). Belaney joined the 13th (Montreal) Battalion of the Black Watch. His unit was shipped to France, where he served as a sniper. His comrades accepted his self-presentation as Indian and generally praised his conduct. Belaney was wounded by a gunshot to the wrist in January 1916, and then more seriously on April 23, 1916, with a shot through the foot. When the wounded limb developed gangrene, Belaney was shipped to Britain for treatment, and by coincidence billeted in a Canadian hospital in his home town of Hastings.

While doctors tried to heal his foot, they moved Belaney from one British infirmary to another for a full year. In Britain, Belaney met again with childhood friend, Florence (Ivy) Holmes, and they married. Their marriage failed in a short time, without his having told Holmes that he was still married to Angele Egwuna, whom he had abandoned but not divorced. (See Marriage à la façon du pays.)

Belaney was shipped back to Canada in September 1917, where he received an honourable discharge on November 30, with a disability pension.

Early conservation work and change in identity

In 1925, 37-year-old Belaney (now calling himself "Grey Owl", at least in some situations, and telling people he was Native American) met 19-year-old Gertrude Bernard (aka Anahareo, or Pony), a Mohawk Iroquois teenager who was to be very influential in his life. The story they presented is that she encouraged him to stop trapping and to publish his writing about the wilderness. They had an eight-year affair. When it began, Belaney was still legally married to his first wife Angele Egwuna, and Anahareo was a teenager. But Belaney and Bernard told people they had married each other anyway, with Anahareo saying that their marriage was "informal". Belaney wrote that it was Anahareo's influence that led him to think more deeply about conservation, and that she encouraged his writing and influenced him by saving and raising a pair of beaver kits.

After accompanying him on a trapline, Anahareo attempted to make him see the torture that animals suffered when they were caught in traps. According to Grey Owl's Pilgrims of the Wild, he hunted down a beaver home where he knew a mother beaver to be and set a trap for her. When the trap caught the mother beaver, Belaney began to canoe away to the cries of kitten beavers which greatly resemble the sound of human infants. Anahareo begged him to set the mother free, but he could not be swayed from his position because they needed the money from the beaver's pelt. The next day, he went back for the baby beavers which the couple adopted. As Albert Braz stated in his article "St. Archie of the Wild", "Indeed, primarily because of this episode, Belaney comes to believe that it is 'monstrous' to hunt such creatures and determines to 'study them' rather than 'persecuting them further.

Belaney's first journal article, "The Falls of Silence", was published under the name A.S. Belaney in Country Life, the English sporting and society magazine. He also published articles on animal lore as "Grey Owl" in Forest & Outdoors, a publication of the Canadian Forestry Association. He became increasingly known in Canada and the United States. In 1928, the National Park Service made a film featuring Grey Owl and Anahareo, which showed them with two beavers which they had taken in as kits and raised after their mother was killed. As Grey Owl, he wrote twenty-five articles for Canadian Forest and Outdoors magazine between 1930 and 1935, published while he was in the midst of writing his first book.

His first book as Grey Owl was called The Men of the Last Frontier, published in 1931, and it traced the devastating story of the beaver as well as posed some very valid concerns about the future of Canada and its forests. Beaver pelts had become such a hot commodity in Canadian industry that the beaver was on the verge of extinction when Anahareo helped him understand the desperate need for protecting the animal instead of trapping it. According to Grey Owl in The Men of the Last Frontier, trappers swarmed to the forests in higher numbers than ever before in 1930 because of the beaver's scarcity, and he argued that the only way to save this animal was to remove all of the trappers from the forests. This was an extremely difficult feat however because their pelts were so valuable and the job economy was so poor in the 1930s that he described their role in the economy as "beavers [being] to the north what gold was to the west". Though much of his focus in his writings were on the beaver, he also believed that this animal could be used as a symbol for the disappearing future of Canadian wilderness in a broader sense. He believed that Canada's wilderness and vastly open nature was what made it unique from other countries of the world, and this was disappearing at an extremely fast rate due to consumerism and the modernist emphasis on capital. He also discussed in The Men of the Last Frontier how the Canadian government and logging industry were working together to project a false image of forest preservation in order to gain possession of Canada's forests and rid them of their resources, burn down what remained, and attempt to replant "synthetic forests" in their places. His The Men of the Last Frontier was a call of desperation for the people of Canada to awaken from their immobility and resist the destruction of their country as the forests were being turned into deserts for profit.

Work with Dominion Parks Branch
Grey Owl's relationship with Parks Canada, known in the 1930s as Dominion Parks Branch, began when he published stories through the Canadian Forestry Association. His publications in Canadian Forest and Outdoors brought him into contact with Gordon Dallyn, the then editor of Canadian Forest and Outdoors, who introduced him to James Harkin, the Parks Branch Commissioner. Sharing similar concerns over wilderness conservation, the Parks Branch agreed to make a film with Grey Owl and Jelly Roll (his pet beaver) with the goal of "provid[ing] a living argument for conservation." W. J. Oliver, who at the time was under contract with the Parks Branch, was the prominent cameraman of the films commissioned by Parks Branch; along with filming Grey Owl, Oliver also took many pictures of him looking "consciously Indian." These photographs were used as illustrations in The Men of the Last Frontier among other works by Grey Owl and as publicity for his lecturing tours. The film received good reception from the Forestry Association. Thinking it would bring increased tourism to the national park which Grey Owl would be working at, along with serving as a platform where Grey Owl could promote his work, James Harkin offered Grey Owl a job at the Riding Mountain National Park in early 1931.

In 1931, Grey Owl and Anahareo moved briefly (with their beavers) to a cabin in Riding Mountain National Park to find a sanctuary for them. Riding Mountain National Park was found to be an unsuitable habitat for the beavers, as a summer drought resulted in the lake water level sinking, and becoming stagnant. Both the beavers and Grey Owl were unhappy with the situation, causing Grey Owl to search, with the support of the Dominion Parks Branch, for better living conditions. The Parks Branch suggested Prince Albert National Park, situated 450 miles north-west of Riding Mountain National Park. Grey Owl and Anahareo found the park suitable for their needs as it was isolated, teeming with wildlife, heavily wooded, and Grey Owl had a favourable impression of the Superintendent of the Park, Major J.A. Wood. The greater sized waterway of Prince Albert National Park was found to be a more suitable beaver habitat, as the lake at Riding Mountain National Park had a risk of freezing to the bottom during winter.

Grey Owl told his publisher and future biographer, Lovat Dickson, the following story about his origins:
He was the son of a Scottish father and Apache mother. He claimed his father was a man named George MacNeil, who had been a scout during the 1870s Indian Wars in the southwestern United States. Grey Owl said his mother was Katherine Cochise of the Apache, Jicarilla band. He further said that both parents had been part of the Wild Bill Hickok Western show that toured England. Grey Owl claimed to have been born in 1888 in Hermosillo, Mexico, while his parents were performing there.

In the 1930s Grey Owl wrote many articles for the Canadian Forestry Association (CFA) publication Forests and Outdoors, including the following:
King of the Beaver People (January 1931)
 A Day in a Hidden Town (April 1931) 
A Mess of Pottage (May 1931) 
The Perils of Woods Travel (September 1931) 
Indian Legends and Lore (October 1931) 
A Philosophy of the Wild (December 1931)

His article, "A Description of the Fall Activities of Beaver, with some remarks on Conservation", was collected in Harper Cory's book Grey Owl and the Beaver (London: Thomas Nelson and Sons Ltd, 1935).

In 1935–36 and 1937–38, Grey Owl toured Canada and Britain (including Hastings) to promote his books and lecture about conservation. His popularity attracted large, interested audiences, as Pilgrims in the Wild at one point was selling 5,000 copies a month. Grey Owl appeared in traditional Ojibwa clothing as part of his First Nations identity. Although his aunts recognised him at his 1935 appearance in Hastings, they did not talk about his true, British origins until 1937.

Between 1936 and his death he was informally visited at his base by the then Governor-General, Lord Tweedsmuir, an admirer of Grey Owl's writings on wildlife, an event photographed by Shuldham Redfern.

During a publication tour of Canada, Grey Owl met Yvonne Perrier, a French Canadian woman. In November 1936 they married.

Alcohol use
Following his return from service in the First World War, Belaney's use of alcohol increased, and it was not unusual for him to appear drunk in public. On the ship back to Canada from his 1935 British tour, it was noted that he "drank heavily, ate only onions and was noticeably ill." Excessive alcohol consumption compromised Grey Owl's position with the Dominion Parks Branch in Ottawa. He was supposed to meet a group of important governmental officials at the studio of Yousuf Karsh, who had organised a dinner in his honour. However, as the dinner began, Grey Owl was absent. Karsh later found him "raising a drunken row in the bar." This public display of a Parks Branch employee drunk in public caused James Harkin to have to defend Grey Owl's position within Parks Branch to the Assistant Deputy Minister Roy A. Gibson. His consumption of alcohol at Prince Albert National Park created more friction between himself and Parks Branch as he was seen to "indulge too freely in liquor."

Conservationist views
Initially, Grey Owl's efforts and conservation were focused towards the beaver up North; however, with the publication of The Men of the Last Frontier, his conservation efforts came to include all wild animals. While he had at one time been a fur trapper, he came to believe that "the trap, the rifle, and poison" would some day result in "the Dwellers in the forest to come to an end too." He expressed in Pilgrims of the Wild how humanity's rush to exploit natural resources for commercial value overlooks "the capabilities and possibilities of the wild creatures involved in it." It was this "commodification of all living things that was responsible for the destruction from the beaver." Grey Owl expressed that if there were "temporary at least" protection for fur bearing animals, then humanity would "see the almost human response to kindness" from animals. He called for people to remember "you belong to Nature, not it to you." Men of the Last Frontier was first called The Vanishing Frontier, and subsequently named Men of the Last Frontier by the publishers, which he felt "missed the entire point of the book" as he "spoke of nature, not men." The changing of the title exemplified for him the conception of people "that man governs the powers of nature."

Death
The tours were fatiguing for Grey Owl and his years of alcoholism weakened him. In April 1938, he returned to Beaver Lodge, his cabin at Ajawaan Lake. Five days later, he was found unconscious on the floor of the cabin. Although taken to Prince Albert hospital for treatment, he died of pneumonia on April 13, 1938. He was buried near his cabin.

His first wife Angele proved her marriage and, although she had not seen him for several years, inherited most of his estate. After their deaths, Anahareo and Shirley Dawn (died June 3, 1984) in turn were buried at Ajawaan Lake.

Exposure 
Doubts about Grey Owl's supposed First Nation identity had been circulating and stories were published immediately after his death. The North Bay Nugget newspaper ran the first exposé the day of his death, a story which they had been holding for three years. This was followed up by international news organisations, such as The Times. His publisher Lovat Dickson tried to prove Belaney's claimed identity, but had to admit that his friend had lied to him. His popularity and support for his causes led The Ottawa Citizen to conclude, "Of course, the value of his work is not jeopardized. His attainments as a writer and naturalist will survive."  This opinion was widely shared in the UK national press.

While his writings showed his deep knowledge and concern about the environment, Belaney's account of his origins as "Grey Owl" was fictional. The consequences of the revelation were dramatic. Publishers immediately ceased producing his books under the name "Grey Owl". In some cases, his books were withdrawn from publication. This in turn affected the conservation causes with which Belaney had been associated, resulting in a decrease in donations.

Posthumous recognition
In 1972 the Canadian Broadcasting Corporation (CBC) produced a documentary special on Grey Owl, directed by Nancy Ryley. In 1999, the film Grey Owl was released. It was directed by Richard Attenborough and starred Pierce Brosnan. The film received mixed reviews and received no theatrical release in the United States.

In June 1997, the mayor of Hastings and the borough's Member of Parliament (MP) (Michael Foster) unveiled a plaque in his honor on the house at 32 St. James Road, Hastings, East Sussex, where he was born.

The ranger station at Hastings Country Park, 4 miles to the east of Hastings, also has a commemorative plaque to Grey Owl. A full-size replica of his Canadian lakeside cabin is in Hastings Museum at Summerfields. An exhibition of memorabilia and a commemorative plaque are at the house at 36 St. Mary's Terrace where he lived with his grandmother and aunts.

The cabin in Riding Mountain National Park where he resided for six months in 1931 has been designated as a Federal Heritage Building and was restored in June 2019.

The cabin he had built in the 1930s still stands in Prince Albert National Park and can be reached by foot (20 kilometer hike) or by canoe (a 16 km paddle).

Marriages and families
Belaney had relationships with at least five women. He deserted his first wife and child, later committing bigamy by marrying Florence Holmes in England. He had a daughter with his first wife and another with his third, and was known to have fathered a boy as well.

Women in Belaney's life:
Angele Egwuna (Anishinaabe), married August 1910. Daughter Agnes Belaney.
A Métis woman, whose name appears to be unknown, with whom Belaney had a son. She died of tuberculosis soon after the boy was born and he was raised by her family.
Florence (Ivy) Holmes, married in England in 1917. No children.
Gertrude Bernard (aka Anahareo) (Mohawk), eight-year affair beginning when she was only 19, started in 1925. Two daughters including Shirley Dawn, b. 1932. Separated 1936. She denied having known he was an imposter. 
Yvonne Perrier (French Canadian), "married" November 1936. No children.
Marie Girard (Gerrard, Jero) with whom he had a son.

Grey Owl books
 The Men of the Last Frontier
 Pilgrims of the Wild
 The Adventures of Sajo and her Beaver People. London: Lovat Dickson Ltd., 1935.
 Tales of an Empty Cabin
A long story from Tales of an Empty Cabin was published separately in 1937 as a small volume:
 The Tree. London: Lovat Dickson Ltd., 1937.
Two biographical tributes were published by Lovat Dickson:
 The Green Leaf: A Memorial to Grey Owl, London, 1938.
 Half-Breed; The Story of Grey Owl, London, 1939.
Gertrude Bernard (Anahareo) wrote a memoir of her life with him: 
 Devil in Deerskins: my life with Grey Owl, New Press, Toronto, 1972

Collected editions
Grey Owl's first three books, The Men of the Last Frontier, Pilgrims of the Wild and Sajo and her Beaver People, have been collected and reprinted as Grey Owl: Three Complete and Unabridged Canadian Classics. Excerpts from all four of his books were collected in The Book of Grey Owl: Selected Wildlife Stories (1938;).

Translations
 Ambassadeur des bêtes. (Ambassador of the Beasts, was: Part 2 of Tales of an Empty Cabin) Translation by Simonne Ratel. Paris : Hatier-Boivin, 1956
 Саджо и её бобры. Перевод с английского Аллы Макаровой. Предисловие Михаила Пришвина. Москва: Детгиз, 1958
  Cаджо та її бобри. Переклад з англійської Соломії Павличко., Київ: «Веселка», 1986
 Historia opuszczonego szałasu Translation by Aleksander Dobrot [Wiktor Grosz]. Warsaw (Poland): Towarzystwo Wydawnicze "Rój" 1939 
 Két kicsi hód (The Adventures of Sajo and Her Beaver People). Translated from the English by Ervin Baktay (1957); illustrations by Péter Szecskó. Hungary, Budapest : Móra Ferenc Könyvkiadó, 1957. 
 Ludzie z ostatniej granicy Translation by Aleksander Dobrot [Wiktor Grosz]. Warsaw (Poland): Wydawnictwo J. Przeworskiego, 1939
 Индијанка Саџо и њени дабрићи. Translation by Виктор Финк. Illustrated by Михаило Писањук. Covers Ида Ћирић. Дечији Свет, Младо Поколеље, Београд (Belgrade, Serbia), 1967
 Oameni și animale, pelerini ai ținuturilor sălbatice. Translation into Romanian by Viorica Vizante. Iasi, Junimea, 1974
 Рассказы опустевшей хижины. Перевод и предисловие Аллы Макаровой. Художник Б.Жутовский. Москва: Молодая гвардия, 1974
 Pielgrzymi Puszczy Translation by Aleksander Dobrot [Wiktor Grosz]. Warsaw (Poland): Wydawnictwo J. Przeworskiego, 1937
 Pilgrims of the Wild. Éd. ordinaire. Translation by Jeanne Roche-Mazon. Paris : Éditions contemporaines, 1951
 Récits de la cabane abandonnée. (Part1 of Tales of an Empty Cabin) Translation by Jeanne-Roche-Mazon. Paris : Éditions contemporaines, 1951
 Sajo et ses castors (The Adventures of Sajo and Her Beaver People) Translated from the English by Charlotte and Marie-Louise Pressoir; illustrations by Pierre Le Guen. Paris : Société nouvelle des éditions G.P., 1963
 Sajon ja hänen majavainsa seikkailut Translation by J.F. Ruotsalainen. WSOY Finland 1936
 Sejdżio i jej bobry Translation by Aleksander Dobrot [Wiktor Grosz]. Warsaw (Poland): Wydawnictwo J. Przeworskiego, 1938
 Seidzo ja tema kobraste seiklused (The adventures of Sajo and her Beaver people) Translation into Estonian by E. Heinaste, Tallinn, 1967

See also
 Chief Buffalo Child Long Lance
 Forrest Carter
 Iron Eyes Cody
 Manitonquat (Medicine Story)
 Nasdijj
 Ward Churchill 
 Passing as Indigenous Americans
 Pretendian
 Aldo Leopold 
 Two Moon Meridas
 Red Thunder Cloud

References

Further reading
Numerous books about Belaney have been published, including:
 Anahareo. Devil in Deerskins: My Life with Grey Owl. Toronto: Paperjacks, 1972.
 Attenborough, Richard, dir. Grey Owl. Screenplay by William Nicholson. Largo Entertainment, 1999.
 Atwood, Margaret. "The Grey Owl Syndrome", Strange Things: The Malevolent North in Canadian Literature. Oxford: Clarendon, 1995. 35–61.
 Dickson, Lovat. Wilderness Man: The Strange Story of Grey Owl. 1974.
 Smith, Donald B. From the Land of Shadows: the Making of Grey Owl. 1990.
 Ruffo, Armand Garnet, Grey Owl: The Mystery of Archie Belaney. 1996.

External links

See the silent films Beaver People (1928) and The Beaver Family (1929), National Film Board of Canada
"Grey Owl", Prince Albert National Park
Canadian Heroes in Fact and Fiction: Grey Owl, Library and Archives Canada website

Historica Minutes TV Commercial, Canadian Heritage

1888 births
1938 deaths
20th-century Canadian novelists
20th-century English novelists
20th-century naturalists
Animal trapping
British emigrants to Canada
Canadian Army soldiers
Canadian environmentalists
Canadian Expeditionary Force soldiers
Canadian military personnel of World War I
Canadian male novelists
Canadian naturalists
Deaths from pneumonia in Saskatchewan
English environmentalists
English male novelists
English naturalists
Impostors
People educated at Hastings Grammar School
People from Hastings
People from Temagami
Persons of National Historic Significance (Canada)
Race in the United States
Sniper warfare
Writers from Prince Albert, Saskatchewan